is the traditional name of month of January in the Japanese calendar. It may also refer to:

People with the given name
, Japanese kickboxer
, Japanese footballer 
Mutsuki Misaki, an author of Clannad

Fictional characters
Mutsuki Kamijoh
Mutsuki Tachibana, a fictional character in Fatal Frame II: Crimson Butterfly
Mutsuki Hajime

Other uses
The Japanese destroyer Mutsuki

Japanese masculine given names